Leisure Leagues is an franchise of five and six-a-side football leagues primarily in the United Kingdom and the Republic of Ireland. As of April 2017, the Leisure Leagues network had more than 3,000 leagues in the UK alone, which made it the largest independent network of leagues in the world.

History 

In the 1980s, a group of sports facility managers started a network of small-sided football leagues. In 1990, they adopted the name Leisure Leagues and were mainly found in rural or provincial towns in the UK where the opportunity for low-cost competitive sport was limited. The Leisure League Allstars, which allowed teams to play others across the countries, was formed in 1998. Leagues appeared in the Republic of Ireland in 2007, in the United States in 2012, in Pakistan in 2017, and Mexico in 2019. The Pakistan leagues were launched with a series of exhibition games played by footballers such as Ronaldinho and Ryan Giggs.

In March 2020, Leisure Leagues organized a tournament to celebrate International Women's Day. Aga Khan W.F.C. won the title among eight teams. For Breast Cancer Awareness Month in October, Leisure Leagues held the Women Football's Pink Cup 2020, which was won by Diya W.F.C.

Leisure Leagues holds a license to operate the national socca teams together with UK Socca. Leisure leagues played a central role in the first ever Socca World Cup in Lisbon. The 32-team event was largely organised by Leisure Leagues. Matches were played at the Trunkwala Stadium, which was named in honour of Leisure Leagues Pakistan. Leisure Leagues Brand Ambassador Mark Clattenburg refereed the final, which was won by Germany.

Celebrity supporters include Alan Wiley, Alex McLeish, Stephen Kelly, Jeff Kenna. Gordon Brown, David Cameron, Usain Bolt and Boris Johnson.

Charities 
Leisure Leagues donates its profits to a range of charities, including Cancer Research UK, the Dogs Trust and Blind Children UK. They are also committed to keep their travel carbon neutral.

List of leagues 
The following is a selection of Leisure Leagues competitions as of February 2020.

Six-a-side leagues

Five-a-side leagues
 Brighton
 Halifax
 Stockport

References

Association football leagues in the Republic of Ireland
Football leagues in Scotland
Football leagues in Wales
Association football leagues in Northern Ireland
Football leagues in Pakistan
Indoor soccer competitions